Friday Barnes, Girl Detective is a 2014 Children's novel by R. A. Spratt. It is about an 11-year-old girl, Friday, who uses her detecting skills to solve mysteries at her boarding school.

Publication history
2014, Australia, Random House Australia 
2016, Phil Grosier (illus.), 272p. USA, Roaring Brook Press

Reception
A review in Kirkus Reviews of Friday Barnes wrote "Spratt begins this new series with a nifty, engaging protagonist who can keep readers laughing and help young geeks feel good about themselves.", and complimented Gosier's illustrations, while Reading Time was somewhat critical of the apparent contradiction between its young reader format and older reader language.

Common Sense Media and Booklist (that gave a star review) were both complimentary.

Friday Barnes has also been reviewed by Publishers Weekly (star review), BookPage, The Bulletin of the Center for Children's Books, Australian Literacy Educators' Association,
School Library Journal, Horn Book Guide Reviews, and School Library Connection.

Entertainment Weekly in its 2016 list of best middle-grade books gave Friday Barnes an honorable mention.

References

External links

Library holdings of Friday Barnes

2014 Australian novels
2014 children's books
Fictional amateur detectives
Novels set in boarding schools
Australian mystery novels
Children's mystery novels
Random House books